The mass media in Ghana, includes television, radio, internet publishing and newspapers.

History

19th century
The media in the Gold Coast first emerged in the 19th century with the publication of The Gold Coast Gazette and Commercial Intelligencer in 1822. The paper had several functions: to provide information for civil servants and European merchants; and to help promote literacy rates and rural development among the local population - while encouraging unity with the Gold Coast government. In the mid-19th century, a diverse number of African-owned papers appeared that were largely unrestricted by the colonial government. This led to a surge of independent press, which in part led to the independence of Ghana.

Colonial Governor Sir Arnold Hodson introduced the first radio channel, named Radio ZOY, on 31 July 1935, before it was renamed to the Ghana Broadcasting Corporation upon the country's independence in 1957. Its main use was to spread propaganda to gain support of the colonies

Post-independence
Following the 6 March 1957 declaration of independence by Ghana from the United Kingdom, there were only around four newspapers. Leader Kwame Nkrumah eventually controlled all the press in Ghana and saw it as an instrument of state authority, providing propaganda that encouraged national unity and creating a hierarchal system of state apparatus to manage the media. Transfer of the media had changed hands from a civilian to a military government, and a series of arrests and imprisonment of political opponents by Nkrumah had a chilling effect on the media. The opposition Ashanti Pioneer, which had operated since the 1930s, was shut down by Nkrumah after being subject to censorship. After Nkrumah's overthrow in a coup, many state outlets changed hands, though still under the control of the ruling party. The National Liberation Council (NLC) imposed stricter controls on domestic private outlets; for example, the Rumours Decree in 1966 that prevented anyone from suing government-owned newspapers.

In 1969, the democratically elected civilian government of Kofi Busia that followed the NLC were left with a large number of media outlets under state control. Busia repealed various acts and dismissed the owner of the state-owned Daily Graphic for opposing Busia, who had appealed for African dialogue with the apartheid government in South Africa. However, when Ignatius Kutu Acheampong overthrew the Busia government, he reinstated strict media control and clamped down on opposition outlets by cutting off foreign exchange. However, a number of opposition media remained unimpeded during the Acheampong regime, and by 1978 had grown in their calls for a multi-party democracy in Ghana.

The regime of Acheampong was overthrown in May 1978 by General Akuffo, who reversed some of his predecessors media policies and released jailed journalists and opposition members. This led to the establishment of two party papers: the Star of the Popular Front Party (PFP) and the Gong Gong of the People's National Party (PNP). The Akuffo regime was short lived, ending in another coup d'état by the Armed Forces Revolutionary Council (AFRC) headed by Jerry Rawlings, who repealed the press laws that were passed by Acheampong. Rawlings replaced the chief editor of the Daily Graphic who criticised the AFRC executions, though they had no authority to do so as it undermined the Constitution of the Third Republic, which stated they had to be replaced by the Press Commission. After eight months of the AFRC regime, which had promised media reform but in the end did not materialise, power was returned to the democratically elected PNP with Hilla Limann on 24 September 1979. Limann was an advocate of liberal media reform, establishing a 12-member Press Commission on 25 July 1980. In a speech he said:

The Press Commission, as enshrined in law, were to investigate complaints about the press, uphold press freedom and provide necessary regulation and licensing to media outlets. During Limann's rule, he respected the new Constitution and accepted criticism from the media. This did not last long however, as John Rawlings, citing "corruption and maladministration", once again seized power under the Provisional National Defence Council on 31 December 1981, and repealed the liberal media reforms instigated by Limann. Under the new government, the Third Constitution, along with the Press Commission, was abolished. Through the state-owned Daily Graphic on 5 January 1982, he told the press to lead the "Holy War" and direct the revolution. Rawlings passed laws that prevented criticism of the government or its policies, dismissed editors critical of him and passed various laws such as the Preventive Custody Law and Newspaper Licensing Law which allowed indefinite detention without trial of journalists, and stifled private media development respectively. The PNDC Secretary of Information Joyce Aryee in 1983 defended direct government control:

The policies not only affected print media but also the Ghana Broadcasting Corporation, with several dismissals or premature retirement. As a result, some media avoided all discussions of politics altogether and focused on other topics like sport or entertainment instead.

1992-2000
In 1992, Ghana promulgated a new constitution, and returned to democratic rule on 7 January 1993. Rawlings as part of the National Democratic Congress (he retired a Flight Lieutenant of the Ghana Armed Forces) liberalised the media by repealing previous laws the PNDC signed in. The private media, which had previously been silenced under the regime for the past decade, used the new press freedom laws to voice criticism at Rawlings of the years of strict laws and published several accusations of violent authoritarianism and drug abuse. The state media however, maintained a favourable image of Rawlings. Rawlings acknowledged the years of media repression, though he defended the military coup:

Furthermore, Rawlings had pledged to uphold Chapter 12 of the Constitution of Ghana, promoting press freedom, responsibility of both private and state outlets and these freedoms to be additional to human rights. A new 15-member National Press Commission (later Ghanaian Media Commission) was created that was independent of government, which would uphold the aforementioned responsibilities. Despite these new reforms, President Rawlings and the NDC government remained critical of the private press, calling it "politically irresponsible" and motivated by profit. One government official claimed the private media "tested the limits of the government", while others accused it of portraying Parliament as inferior. A group named Friends of Democracy claimed it had 1,000 signatories protesting against the private media. Editors from the Free Press and New Statesman had reported being sent death threats from the NDC for criticising the regime. Valerie Sackey who was an assistant to President Rawlings, noted that the private press had a duty to provide legitimate criticism of the government and to act responsibly, rather than simply portraying that the government was attempting to muzzle them.

2000-present
After the election in 2000 of John Kufuor the tensions between the private media and government decreased. Kufuor was a supporter of press freedom and repealed the criminal libel law, though maintained that the media had to act responsibly. The Ghanaian media has been described as "one of the most unfettered" in Africa, operating with little restriction on private media. The private press often carries criticism of government policy. The media, and broadcast media in particular, were vigorous in their coverage of the 2008 Ghanaian presidential election, and the Ghanaian Journalists Association (GJA) praised John Atta Mills on his election, hoping to foster a good media-government relationship. During a 1999 interview, the GJA described how the media has helped promote democracy in the country:

Due to the new freedom of media, the video game industry in Ghana is growing.

Relations with foreign media
The Ghanaian media holds good relations with foreign media, with many international journalists from Western, African and Asian organisations based in the capital, Accra. Journalists are not hindered during their work, and information is not censored into or out of the country. The main news agency, Ghana News Agency, was set up in 1957 by Nkrumah to provide balanced information on local and international news. Reuters helped provide the agency with guidance and technical assistance until 1961. The agency had subscriptions from over 140 organisations and six news agencies in 2000.

Challenges to Ghanaian media
Despite its relative freedom, the media in Ghana does face some challenges. Journalists in Ghana are often poorly paid, under resourced, and often lack training. As a result, journalists in Ghana find themselves susceptible to bribery and self-censorship. The quality of radio and television broadcast media programming is low. With respect to newspapers, the ownership landscape of newspapers is politically polarized with most newspapers supporting either the government or opposition party lines. Only one newspaper, the state-owned Daily Graphic is truly national in distribution.

Freedom of the press 

Although the constitution and law provide for freedom of speech and press, the government sometimes restricts those rights. The police arbitrarily arrest and detain journalists. Some journalists practice self-censorship. The constitution prohibits arbitrary interference with privacy, family, home, or correspondence, and the government respects these prohibitions in practice.

In 2002 the government of Ghana censored Internet media coverage of tribal violence in Northern Ghana.

Newspapers

Around 135 newspapers are published in Ghana, including 16 independent newspapers and 9 daily newspapers. The contribution of a large number of state and private newspapers create a diverse media environment in Ghana. State papers such as the Daily Graphic and Ghanaian Times tend to promote and encourage support for government policies and follow a conservative line, unlike private press which has exposed lavish styles of government officials and mis-management of government affairs.

The Ghanaian National Media Commission, an independent commission, was set up to monitor and receive complaints about the media. The commission had received 50 complaints in 2002, and in May 2001, forced the Ghanaian Chronicle to apologise for publishing "false stories" on individuals without substantial evidence. However, similar rulings have been ignored due to a lack of authority.

Television and radio

Television was introduced to Ghana in 1965 and was under State control. The Ghana Broadcasting Corporation held a monopoly on television broadcasting until 1994, following the 1992 constitution of the new democratically elected government. Part of the 1992 constitution established the National Media Commission which held the responsibility to promote and ensure the independence of the media.

Shortly after the 1966 coup of Nkrumah by the National Liberation Council (who held an even tighter State grip on the nation's media), the Ghana Broadcasting Corporation announced a decree to, "broadcast programmes in the field of culture, education, information and entertainment, to reflect national progress and aspirations, and to broadcast in the main Ghanaian languages and in English".

There were seven broadcast stations in 2007. Among the stations, there is the state-run Ghana Broadcasting Corporation and four private channels, TV3, Metro TV, Viasat 1, TV Skyy, and TV Africa, with TV3 and Metro TV going on the air in 1997. Foreign stations such as CNN and BBC are freely accessible.

FM radio began in 1988, which allowed foreign radio stations into the country, such as Voice of America, Radio France Internationale and BBC broadcasts on 101.3FM. A public demonstration in 1995 over seizure of equipment from a private station, Radio EYE, forced the government to issue many FM frequencies for other private stations, creating a new era of "broadcast pluralism". Interactive phone-in discussions on local and national issues are very popular on Ghanaian radio. In addition to English-language stations, there are several in local dialect. In 2007, 86 FM and three shortwave stations existed.

Internet

The Internet was used by an estimated 4.2 million Ghanaians in 2012, roughly 17% of the population. There was no significant improvement in 2014 as reported by Internet World Statistics there were "5,171,993 Internet users on Dec 31, 2014, 19.6% of the population, per IWS." 

 It is unrestricted by the government.

See also
 Telecommunications in Ghana
 Telephone numbers in Ghana
 New media in Ghana
 Ghanaian literature
 News Ghana

References

Bibliography

External links
Ghana - 2004 Annual Report, Reporters Without Borders

 
Ghana
Ghana

de:Ghana#Medien